Freddy vs. Jason is a 2003 American slasher film directed by Ronny Yu and written by Damian Shannon and Mark Swift. It is a crossover between the A Nightmare on Elm Street and Friday the 13th franchises, being the eighth installment in the former and the eleventh in the latter. The film joins the two series in a shared universe and pits their respective antagonists, Freddy Krueger and Jason Voorhees, against each other. Freddy is weakened and forgotten because the citizens of his home town Springwood have defeated him by using medications that repress dreams. Freddy awakens Jason to stir up fear and grow his powers so that he may return and kill again. Jason turns out to not be as easily controlled as Freddy initially thought, and the two supernatural mass murderers come into conflict. The film is chronologically set after Freddy's Dead: The Final Nightmare (1991) and Jason Goes to Hell: The Final Friday (1993), and is the last film in each franchise before their respective reboots.

Freddy vs. Jason was released in the United States on August 15, 2003. The film received mixed reviews from critics but grossed over $116 million worldwide, making it the highest-grossing film in each series. The film marks Robert Englund's final cinematic appearance as Freddy Krueger. A sequel and crossover with the Evil Dead franchise was planned, but it was ultimately scrapped and turned into a comic book limited series, Freddy vs. Jason vs. Ash, and its follow-up The Nightmare Warriors.

Plot
Since his last defeat, Freddy Krueger has been in Hell and unable to invade children's dreams, as the adults of Springwood have gone to extremes to make sure their children have forgotten him. Using his remaining power, Freddy resurrects Jason Voorhees. Appearing as Jason's mother, Pamela Voorhees, he manipulates Jason into killing the teens of Springwood to create fear in the townsfolk that Freddy has returned, which would allow him to regain his strength.

Meanwhile, Lori Campbell, who lives with her widowed father, has a sleepover with her friends Kia and Gibb. They are later joined by Trey, Gibb's emotionally abusive boyfriend, and his friend Blake. Jason enters the house and murders Trey, and the police suspect Freddy. After a nightmare, Blake awakens to find his father decapitated by Jason, who then kills Blake himself. The police call it a murder–suicide the following day, hoping to conceal Freddy's return from the rest of the town.

Elsewhere, Lori's ex-boyfriend Will Rollins and his friend Mark Davis, forcibly institutionalized at the Westin Hills Psychiatric Hospital, are made to take Hypnocil to suppress their dreams because of their previous contact with Freddy. A news report about the killings prompts them to escape and return to Springwood to warn Lori about Freddy. That night, Lori and the others attend a rave in a cornfield. Freddy tries to kill Gibb in a nightmare, but Jason kills her first in the real world along with others at the rave, angering Freddy, who realizes that Jason’s killing spree will deny him victims.

Will, Lori, and Kia escape the rave with school nerd Charlie Linderman and stoner Bill Freeburg. After dropping off the latter three and a confrontation with Dr. Campbell (who was responsible for having Will and Mark committed to Westin Hills) over Will's certainty that he saw Lori's father murder her mother, Will and Lori head to Mark’s house, only to see him get killed by Freddy. Deputy Scott Stubbs, believing Jason is a copycat killer, makes contact with Lori and her friends, who deduce Freddy's plan. Learning about Hypnocil, they try to get it from Westin Hills; however, Freddy possesses Freeburg, using him to dispose of the medicine. Jason arrives and electrocutes Stubbs. Freddy uses the possessed Freeburg to tranquilize Jason, causing him to fall asleep after slashing Freeburg in half.

The teens devise a plan to pull Freddy from the dream world into reality and force him to fight Jason, bringing the unconscious Jason back home to Camp Crystal Lake, where the real estate is in development. Freddy fights Jason in the dream world, where he discovers that Jason has a subconscious fear of drowning. Freddy uses this to his advantage and Jason becomes afraid, reverting to his younger self. Lori goes to sleep to pull Freddy out and save Jason. As Freddy tortures Lori in the dream world, revealing that he murdered her mother, Jason awakens at the real Camp Crystal Lake and pursues the teens, killing Linderman. Lori is awakened and pulls Freddy into the physical world, where he is confronted by Jason.

Freddy and Jason fight throughout the campgrounds, during which Jason kills Kia. Freddy uses the construction site to gain the upper hand and cuts off Jason's fingers, allowing Freddy to take his machete. As Freddy is slicing away at Jason, Lori distracts him before Jason punches his fingerless hand through Freddy's torso. Freddy retaliates by plunging Jason's machete into his side and Jason rips Freddy's gloved arm off. Lori and Will set the dock on fire, causing numerous propane tanks to explode and throwing Freddy and Jason into the lake. Lori and Will embrace as Freddy makes his way to them on the dock and is about to kill the couple with Jason's machete, but he is impaled by Jason with his clawed arm, allowing Lori to behead Freddy with the machete. Jason falls off the dock and Freddy's head and body sink into the lake, both seemingly dead. After dropping the machete where Jason submerged, Lori and Will leave.

The following morning, Jason emerges from the water, holding his machete and Freddy's severed head. Freddy winks and his laughter is heard in the background, leaving the winner ambiguous.

Cast

 Robert Englund as Freddy Krueger
 Ken Kirzinger as Jason Voorhees
 Spencer Stump as young Jason Voorhees
 Monica Keena as Lori Campbell
 Kelly Rowland as Kia Waterson
 Jason Ritter as Will Rollins
 Chris Marquette as Charlie Linderman
 Lochlyn Munro as Deputy Scott Stubbs
 Katharine Isabelle as Gibb Smith
 Brendan Fletcher as Mark Davis
 Zack Ward as Bobby Davis, Mark's older brother
 Kyle Labine as Bill Freeburg
 Chris Gauthier as Shack
 David Kopp as Blake
 Jesse Hutch as Trey Cooper
 Tom Butler as Dr. Campbell
 Garry Chalk as Sheriff Williams
 Paula Shaw as Pamela Voorhees

Additionally, Evangeline Lilly had a walk-on role as a high-school student. Professional wrestler Óscar Gutiérrez, better known by his ring name Rey Mysterio, was Englund's stunt double for a scene in Freddy's boiler room lair. New Line Cinema studio chief Robert Shaye, who produced every preceding Nightmare on Elm Street film, played the school principal (credited as L.E. Moko).

Production

Development
Influenced by fan desire for a crossover film with a fight between Freddy and Jason, New Line Cinema and Paramount Pictures tried to make a Freddy vs. Jason movie in 1987. Frank Mancuso Jr. enlisted Tom McLoughlin to unite the studios, but no agreement could be made. When Friday the 13th Part VIII: Jason Takes Manhattan failed at the box office, Sean S. Cunningham wanted to reacquire the rights to Friday the 13th and begin working with New Line Cinema on Freddy vs. Jason. Paramount and New Line wanted the license to the other's character so they could control a crossover film. Negotiations on the project collapsed, and Paramount made Jason Takes Manhattan. After Friday the 13th Part VIII: Jason Takes Manhattan was released in 1989, the rights reverted to Scuderi, Minasian, and Barsamianto (who sold them to New Line). Two years after initial talks fell apart, director Joseph Zito attempted to revive the project, but neither Mancuso or Robert Shaye were interested in pursuing the project. Before Cunningham could begin to work on Freddy vs. Jason, Wes Craven returned to New Line to make New Nightmare. This put Freddy vs. Jason on hold, but allowed Cunningham to bring Jason back with Jason Goes to Hell: The Final Friday. The ninth installment "turned a healthy profit". In a 1995 interview with Fangoria, Craven was dismissive of the idea of Freddy vs. Jason, saying it was taking "something that had a lot of impact and dignity and dragging it down to another level."<ref>{{cite web|last=Cotter|first=Padraig|url=https://screenrant.com/freddy-jason-movie-wes-craven-declined-reason/|title=Why Wes Craven Passed On 'Freddy Vs Jason|date=May 2, 2021|website=ScreenRant|access-date=June 28, 2022}}</ref> Cunningham's "frustration" with the delayed development of Freddy vs. Jason led him to create Jason X to keep the series alive. Based on Jason Takes Manhattans concept of taking Jason away from Crystal Lake, the tenth film put the titular character in space. The film lost its biggest supporter with the resignation of president of production Michael De Luca. Lack of support let the finished film sit for two years before it was released on April 26, 2002. It was the series' lowest-grossing film at the domestic box office, and had the largest budget of any of the films to date. Jason Goes to Hell duo Adam Marcus and Dean Lorey were courted early on, but no official deal was finalized.

New Line spent a reported $6 million on script development alone from several different writers. Lewis Abernathy, writer of Deepstar Six and House IV, was the first screenwriter attached to the film. Abernathy sought to direct his script, entitled Nightmare 13: Freddy Meets Jason, but his limited directing experience prohibited him from doing so. David J. Schow was given an offer to write the script because he just happened to walk by De Luca's office one day. Schow revised Abernathy's script, expanding upon a cult that worships Freddy Krueger. In 1994, De Luca passed on the draft and turned to Brannon Braga and Ronald D. Moore, who wrote Jason vs. Freddy, which had a more "adult tone" than previous entries. The writing duo would depart the film and would be replaced by Peter Briggs, who impressed the studio with his previous crossover attempt, Alien vs. Predator. Briggs' draft saw numerous returning characters across several films. By 1996, Demon Knight scribes Cyrus Voris and Ethan Reiff were commissioned by Cunningham to write a new script, under the title Freddy vs. Jason: Millennium Massacre, with Rob Bottin, known for his make-up work on The Thing and Total Recall, directing. New Line previously offered the spot to Guillermo del Toro and Peter Jackson to no avail. Bottin opted to drop the current draft of the script and penned his own treatment. David S. Goyer and his writing partner James Dale Robinson were subsequently hired to flesh out Bottin's treatment into a screenplay. No parties involved were happy with the script, leading to Goyer and Robinson exiting the film.  Bottin and his treatment were retained despite clashing with the studio over the film's budget. Screenwriting duo Jonathan Aibel and Glenn Berger, known for their work on King of the Hill, were selected by the director to write a new script. The draft was widely disliked at Cunningham Productions. Bottin initially considered revising the script himself, but ultimately left the film altogether.

In 1999, Mark Verheiden entered the project and proposed releasing the film with two different endings; one with Freddy winning and one with Jason winning. The next year, De Luca hired Mark Protosevich to write an entirely new script. Jason X writer Todd Farmer wrote for the film as well. Newcomers Mark Swift & Damian Shannon were hired after delivering a pitch that De Luca was happy with in March 2002. Goyer returned to the project once again in an effort to trim "every ounce of fat" from Swift and Shannon's 120-page script. Wes Craven, Guillermo del Toro, and Ronny Yu all declined the opportunity to direct the film. Rob Zombie turned the film down in favor to helm House of 1000 Corpses. Then up-and-coming filmmaker Jaume Balagueró campaigned to direct the film. Yu would ultimately sign on to direct the film in May 2002 after being given an "enormous" amount of creative freedom. According to Swift and Shannon, several endings were considered for the film; one involved Pinhead of the Hellraiser franchise, but New Line did not want to secure the rights for the character.

Casting
In 1999, Robert Englund officially signed onto the film, marking his eighth appearance as the character of Freddy Krueger. In August 2002, Entertainment Weekly revealed Kelly Rowland and Brad Renfro were cast in the film, while Kane Hodder would reprise his role as Jason Voorhees. However, conflicting reports emerged with IGN stating that the film was looking to reinvent the character, thus ditching Hodder. Monica Keena was selected to portray the film's lead after an "extensive search", while the supporting cast were made up of Canadian actors, including Katharine Isabelle, Lochlyn Munro, Brendan Fletcher, Tom Butler, David Kopp, Jesse Hutch, Kyle Labine and Zack Ward. Betsy Palmer was courted to reprise her role as Pamela Voorhees from Friday the 13th, but declined due to salary disputes. Actress Paula Shaw would assume the role from Palmer. Just one week before production commenced, Jason Ritter was cast in place of Renfro.

Casting Jason
New Line, thinking that Freddy vs. Jason needed a fresh start, chose a different actor to play Jason. Cunningham disagreed with their decision, believing that Kane Hodder, who had played Jason in the previous four films, was the best choice for the role. Although Hodder received a script for Freddy vs. Jason and met with director Ronny Yu and New Line executives, Yu and Matthew Barry felt that the role should be recast to fit Yu's image of Jason. Hodder said that New Line did not give him a reason for the recasting; according to Yu, however, he wanted a taller, slower and more-deliberate Jason. The role went to Ken Kirzinger, a Canadian stuntman who worked on Jason Takes Manhattan. Yu said that Kirzinger was hired because he was taller than Robert Englund, who played Freddy Krueger. Kirzinger believed that his experience on Part VIII (doubling for Hodder in two scenes) and his height helped him land the part. New Line did not cast Kirzinger until they saw him on film, and his first scene was Jason walking down Elm Street. Douglas Tait played Jason in a re-shot ending: 

Filming
Filming for Freddy vs. Jason began on September 9, 2002 in Vancouver and ended on December 10, 2002.

Release

The film was released on VHS and DVD as part of New Line's Platinum Series on January 13, 2004. The DVD release contained a second disc of bonus content with audio commentary by Ronny Yu, Ken Kirzinger and Robert Englund, and deleted and alternate scenes with commentary.  Ill Niño's music video for "How Can I Live"; trailers and TV ads, soundtrack promotion and behind-the-scenes featurettes. The film was released on October 4, 2005 on Universal Media Disc and September 8, 2009 on Blu-ray; the Blu-ray release had the same content as the Platinum Series DVD.

Reception
Box officeFreddy vs. Jason has grossed $82.6 million in the United States and Canada and $34 million in other territories for a total of $116.6 million, against a production budget of $30 million.

The film earned $36.4 million in its opening weekend at 3,014 theaters in North America, topping the box office. It remained number one in its second weekend grossing $13.4 million, and dropped to sixth place in its third weekend with $7.1 million.

Critical response
On Rotten Tomatoes, Freddy vs. Jason has an approval rating of 42% based on 162 reviews and an average rating of 4.98/10. The website's critical consensus reads, "Fans of the two horror franchises will enjoy this showdown. But for everyone else, it's the same old slice and dice." On Metacritic the film has a weighted average score of 37 out of 100 based on 29 reviews, indicating "generally unfavorable reviews". Audiences polled by CinemaScore gave it an average grade of "B+" on an A+-to-F scale.

Kim Newman of Empire gave the film three stars out of five, writing: "FVJ ignores any attempts at cleverness and picks up storylines dropped in Freddy's Dead and Jason Goes To Hell." Sacha Molitorisz of The Sydney Morning Herald wrote: "this is a solid effort, with enough frights, humour, blood, surprises and killer dialogue to entertain consistently." Robert K. Elder of the Chicago Tribune'' gave the film two and a half stars out of four, saying that it "succeeds as a guilty pleasure, a monster mash that clobbers the recent lackluster sequels plaguing both legacies."

Accolades
Doug Chapman and Glenn Ennis were nominated for the Best Fire Stunt award at the Taurus World Stunt Awards 2004 for the double full-body burn and wire stunt. Chapman doubled for Robert Englund as Freddy and Ennis doubled for Ken Kirzinger as Jason in the stunt. The film was also nominated for Best Horror Film at the Saturn Awards.

Novelization
Black Flame published a novelization of the film on July 29, 2003.

See also
Freddy vs. Jason (soundtrack)
Freddy vs. Jason (score)

References

Sources

External links

 
  
 
 
 
 
 Film page at the Camp Crystal Lake web site (archive link)
 Film page at Fridaythe13thfilms.com (archive link)
 Freddy vs. Jason at Nightmare on Elm Street Companion

2003 films
2003 horror films
2000s action horror films
2000s supernatural horror films
2000s monster movies
2000s slasher films
American action horror films
American sequel films
American supernatural horror films
American slasher films
Adaptations of works by Wes Craven
A Nightmare on Elm Street (franchise) films
Casting controversies in film
2000s English-language films
Films about nightmares
American films about revenge
Films directed by Ronny Yu
Films scored by Graeme Revell
Films set in 2003
Films set in hell
Films set in New Jersey
American teen horror films
Films set in Ohio
Films shot in Toronto
Films shot in Vancouver
Friday the 13th (franchise) films
Insomnia in film
Interquel films
New Line Cinema films
Supernatural slasher films
Resurrection in film
Horror crossover films
American crossover films
Films with screenplays by Mark Swift and Damian Shannon
2000s American films